Patricia Terry Holland (born February 16, 1942) is a Latter-day Saint writer and leader. She was a counselor in the Young Women General Presidency of the Church of Jesus Christ of Latter-day Saints (LDS Church) from 1984 to 1986. From 1980 to 1989, Holland was "first lady" of Brigham Young University (BYU) where her husband, Jeffrey R. Holland, was president.

Holland studied at LDS Business College (LDSBC) in 1961, and later studied at Dixie College and the Juilliard School. In 1963, she married Jeffery R. Holland, whom she had dated during high school in St. George, Utah. In 1984, Holland was called as first counselor to Ardeth G. Kapp in the Young Women General Presidency. She was released in 1986 to fulfill obligations at BYU, where her husband was president. Holland was succeeded by Maurine J. Turley, who had been serving as the second counselor in the Young Women General Presidency.

In 2000, Holland published a book A Quiet Heart about responding to chaos. This book won the Association for Mormon Letters Award in 2000 for devotional literature. In 2012, she received the "Distinguished Alumnus Award" from LDSBC for her contributions to the family, her church, and community.

Holland and her husband are the parents of three children, including Matthew S. Holland, who was president of Utah Valley University from 2009 to 2018.

Speeches and publications
Jeffrey R. Holland and Patricia T. Holland, "The Demands of Discipleship", BYU Speeches, 1983-09-13
Patricia T. Holland, "The Fruits of Peace", Ensign, June 1984
Jeffrey R. Holland and Patricia T. Holland, "In the Thick of Life's Urgencies", BYU Speeches, 1984-09-11
Jeffrey R. Holland and Patricia T. Holland, "Unless You're a Mormon", BYU Speeches, 1986-09-09
Patricia T. Holland, "The Soul's Center", BYU Speeches, 1987-01-13
Patricia T. Holland, "Fear Not", BYU Speeches, 1987-09-15
Patricia T. Holland, "'One Thing Needful': Becoming Women of Greater Faith in Christ", Ensign, October 1987
Patricia T. Holland, "Filling the Measure of Your Creation", BYU Speeches, 1989-01-17
Jeffrey R. Holland and Patricia T. Holland, On Earth as it is in Heaven (Salt Lake City, Utah: Deseret Book, 1994) 
Patricia T. Holland, "God's Covenant of Peace", BYU Women's Conference, 1999
Patricia T. Holland, A Quiet Heart (Salt Lake City, Utah: Bookcraft, 2000) 
Jeffrey R. Holland and Patricia T. Holland, "What Time Is This?", BYU Women's Conference, 2007

Notes

External links
LDS Living interview with Patricia Holland

Living people
1942 births
Ensign College alumni
American leaders of the Church of Jesus Christ of Latter-day Saints
Brigham Young University alumni
Juilliard School alumni
Utah Tech University alumni
Counselors in the General Presidency of the Young Women (organization)
People from St. George, Utah
American Latter Day Saint writers
Latter Day Saints from New York (state)
Latter Day Saints from Utah